Annie Macaulay–Idibia  (born 13 November 1984) is a Nigerian, model, presenter, and actress. She was nominated in the "Best Supporting Actress" category at the 2009 Best of Nollywood Awards.

Early life and education
Annie was born in Ibadan but is originally from Eket in Akwa Ibom State. She moved to Lagos with her mother after the divorce of her parents. She holds a degree in Computer Science and Theatre Arts after completing undergraduate courses at Lagos State University and the University of Lagos respectively.

Career
Prior to the start of Macaulay–Idibia's acting career, she competed at the "Queen of All Nations Beauty Pageant" where she placed runner-up and she also went on feature in a cameo appearance on the music video of 2face Idibia's "African Queen" song.

Her Nollywood career came to the limelight for her role in the movies titled Pleasure and Crime and Blackberry Babes. She expressed her excitement on being featured of the cover of the March issue for Glamour South Africa magazine.

The Netflix African reality series Young, Famous & African, which premiered on 18 March 2022, included Macaulay-Idibia and her husband Innocent "2Baba" Idibia as well as other African personalities like Diamond Platnumz, Naked DJ, Nadia Nakai, Swanky Jerry, Andile Ncube, and Kayleigh Schwark.

Selected filmography
 First Family
 Pleasure and Crime
 White Chapel
 Blackberry Babes
 Return of Blackberry Babes
 Estate Runs
   Young,Famous & African
 Unconditional
 Obiageli The Sex Machine
 Morning After Dark
 Beautiful Moster
 Open Scar
 Secret Lovers
 Desires of Married Women

Personal life
Macaulay–Idibia is married to 2face Idibia with whom she has two children. She gave birth to her 1st child, a daughter Isabella Idibia, in December 2008 and her second, Olivia Idibia in January 3rd 2014. She also owns a beauty salon in Atlanta called "BeOlive Hair Studio".

Awards and nominations

References

External links

 

Living people
1984 births
Actresses from Ibadan
Nigerian film actresses
University of Lagos alumni
Lagos State University alumni
21st-century Nigerian actresses
Nigerian beauty pageant contestants
People from Ibadan
Nigerian female models
Nigerian television personalities
Actresses from Akwa Ibom State
People from Akwa Ibom State
Nigerian television presenters